Michael Allen Booker Jr. (born April 27, 1975) is an American former professional cornerback who played five seasons in the National Football League from 1997–2001.

Early years
Michael Booker started playing football later in his childhood. Once he started his athletic skills and technique definitely showed up. While at El Camino High as a Cornerback, Booker was a two-year starter and letterman under Head Coach Herb Meyer. Booker earned all-league honors twice, was named the Long Beach Pre-Telegram BEST in the West and was Co-defensive player of the year in the Southern California area.  Booker finished 12-2 in 1992 and ranked seventh in the state.

College years (1994-1996)
During 1996 Michael Booker was one of the most watched players at the University of Nebraska.  Booker was the MVP on defense in the 1996 Fiesta Bowl against Florida. With his four-tackle, three-breakup, and interception touchdown performance he received attention from everyone including scouts from the NFL.

Awards while at the University of Nebraska
 Member of Two Nebraska National Championship Teams (1994, 1995)
 Second-team All-Big 12 (AP, Coaches, 1996)
 Fiesta Bowl Defensive MVP (1996)
 Nebraska Defensive Player-of-the-Game vs. Arizona State (1995)

NFL career and later years

Booker was drafted by the Atlanta Falcons with the 11th pick of the 1st round of the 1997 NFL Draft. Booker played 3 seasons with the Falcons, including as a starter in Super Bowl XXXIII, which the Falcons lost to the Broncos.

References

1975 births
Living people
Sportspeople from Oceanside, California
American football cornerbacks
Nebraska Cornhuskers football players
Players of American football from California
Atlanta Falcons players
Tennessee Titans players